Our Father is a 2015 British short war drama film written and directed by Calum Rhys. The film stars Luke Goddard, Ross O'Hennessy, Aaron Jeffcoate, Jonas Daniel Alexander and Mark Anthony Games. The film follows a detached British Army section in France during World War II. The film premiered at the 69th Cannes Film Festival.

Cast 

 Luke Goddard as Private Cole (born Yorkshire, England in 1920)
 Ross O'Hennessy as Sergeant Browning (born Monmouthshire, Wales in 1904, residing in East Grinstead, England)
 Aaron Jeffcoate as Private Elder (born Glasgow, Scotland in 1925)
 Jonas Daniel Alexander as Corporal Mason (born London, England in 1915)
 Mark Anthony Games as Private Doyle (born Sussex, England in 1918)
 Willem Ward as Young Cole
 Shawn Booker as Wehrmacht Soldier
 Bruce Parkin as Wehrmacht Soldier
 Ryan Eden as Wehrmacht Soldier
 Morgan Rhys as Wehrmacht Soldier
 Michael Smith as British Soldier

Production 
The film was financed through crowdfunding, with the majority of funding provided by benefactors in the United Kingdom. Further financial support was contributed by backers in Italy, South Korea, Spain and the United States.

Rehearsals began in late July 2014 in Worcester, England followed by principal photography on 9 August 2014 in Worcestershire, with cinematographer Antony Meadley using a Red Epic camera to shoot the entire film. Filming continued for five days at locations including Bromsgrove, Worcester, Malvern and Pershore, with further additional photography in the United States at Wallops Island, Virginia.

Reception

Critical response
The film received positive reviews from critics and festivals. Oaxaca FilmFest described Our Father as "a film that moves with goosebump-raising sensitivity; beautifully shot and well produced". The Independent Critic's Richard Propes wrote that the film is "a journey that maintains semblance of human connection and a humane existence." Bucharest ShortCut CineFest called Our Father "a beautiful poetic approach."

Accolades

References

External links 

 
 

2015 films
2015 war drama films
British drama short films
British war drama films
2010s English-language films
2010s German-language films
Films set in 1944
Films set in France
Films shot in England
Films shot in Worcestershire
British World War II films
2015 drama films
2010s British films